Huby  is a village in the administrative district of Gmina Kłomnice, within Częstochowa County, Silesian Voivodeship, in southern Poland.

On 20 July 2007, an F3 tornado hit by village, and damaged 27 houses. One person was injured.
The village has a population of 101.

References

Huby